Shestakov is a Russian surname, and it may refer to:
 Dmitri Shestakov (born 1983), Russian professional football player
 Igor Shestakov (born 1984), Russian professional footballer
 Ivan Shestakov (18201888), Russian statesman, writer, and admiral
 Kirill Shestakov (born 1985), Russian professional footballer
 Lev Shestakov (19151944), Soviet military aviator and the Red Air Force's leading ace in the Spanish Civil War
 Nikolai Shestakov (1954ca. 1977), Soviet Russian serial killer
 Sergei Shestakov (born 1961), Russian professional football coach and a former player
 Serhiy Shestakov (born 1990), Ukrainian professional football player
 Victor Shestakov (19071987), Russian/Soviet logician and theoretician of electrical engineering
 Vladimir Shestakov (born 1961), Russian judoka who competed for the Soviet Union in the 1988 Summer Olympics
 Yevheniy Shestakov (born 1976), Ukrainian male boxer
 Yuri Shestakov (born 1985), Russian professional football player
 Natalia (Sergeyevna) Shestakova (born 1988, Perm), Russian pair skater

See also
 Shostakovich
 Stasov
 Staškov

Russian-language surnames